Refugiado  is a 2014 Argentine film directed by Diego Lerman and starring Julieta Díaz, Sebastián Molinaro, and Marta Lubos.

Accolades

References

External links 
 

2014 films
Argentine thriller drama films
2010s Spanish-language films